Clash of Wills is a computer wargame published in 1985 by Digital Kamp Group for the Atari 8-bit family and Commodore 64.

Gameplay
Clash of Wills is a game in which the war in Europe (1940-1945) is simulated on both the Eastern and Western Fronts.

Reception
M. Evan Brooks reviewed the game for Computer Gaming World, and stated that "This reviewer has mixed feelings about the product. The scope of the simulation is laudable; its execution is not. Its failures could well have been corrected with some additional development. The designers did not choose to do so, and the net result is a game with a potential for greatness, but a realization of minimal adequacy, at best."

References

1985 video games
Atari 8-bit family games
Commodore 64 games
Computer wargames